Ippei Mizuhara (born December 31, 1984) is a Japanese interpreter employed by the Los Angeles Angels of Major League Baseball (MLB). Mizuhara is most well-known for serving as the interpreter for Angels player Shohei Ohtani, translating Japanese to English and vice versa for Ohtani's media appearances and teammate interactions. He previously worked for the Boston Red Sox as an interpreter for Hideki Okajima and for the Hokkaido Nippon-Ham Fighters of Nippon Professional Baseball (NPB) as an interpreter for several of the team's Anglophone players. 

Mizuhara has gained notoriety among baseball fans for his close association with Ohtani. He frequently aids Ohtani in non-interpreting contexts, such as catching his bullpen sessions or playing catch with him during pregame warmups. During the 2021 MLB Home Run Derby, Mizuhara served as Ohtani's catcher.

Early life
Mizuhara was born on December 31, 1984, in Tomakomai, Hokkaido, Japan. His father, Hidemasa, is a chef and the family moved to the Los Angeles area in 1991 so that he could work there. Mizuhara was raised in Diamond Bar, a city in eastern Los Angeles County near the border with Orange County. He grew up playing soccer and basketball and attended Diamond Bar High School. He graduated from the University of California, Riverside in 2007.

Career
After graduating from college, Mizuhara was hired by the Boston Red Sox to interpret for Japanese pitcher Hideki Okajima. In 2013, he was hired by the Hokkaido Nippon-Ham Fighters to translate for Chris Martin and other English-speaking members of the team. He first met Shohei Ohtani while interpreting for the Fighters as the two both arrived in 2013.

When Ohtani was posted to MLB by the Fighters in 2017 and he signed with the Los Angeles Angels, the team hired Mizuhara to serve as Ohtani's personal interpreter. When Ohtani was a participant in the 2021 MLB Home Run Derby, Mizuhara was chosen as his catcher. He borrowed an extra set of equipment from Angels catcher Max Stassi and practiced with Angels infielder José Iglesias in preparation for the role. Mizuhara had also previously caught some of Ohtani's bullpen sessions. During the 2021–22 MLB lockout, Mizuhara temporarily resigned from his position with the Angels to circumvent rules against players and personnel being in contact in order to continue working with Ohtani. Mizuhara returned to his official position as an Angels employee after the lockout was lifted.

Personal life
Mizuhara was married in 2018.

References

Baseball people from Hokkaido
Boston Red Sox personnel
Hokkaido Nippon-Ham Fighters
People from Diamond Bar, California
People from Tomakomai, Hokkaido
Interpreters
Los Angeles Angels personnel
University of California, Riverside alumni
1984 births
Living people